Typhoon Lupit (lu-PIT, [lʊˈpit]; Filipino word meaning "cruelty" or "viciousness"), known in the Philippines as Typhoon Yoyoy, destroyed the food supply in several small islands in Yap State in the Federated States of Micronesia (FSM). It formed on November 18, 2003, from the monsoon trough to the west of the Marshall Islands. Early in its duration, it moved generally to the west or west-southwest. On November 21, the depression intensified into Tropical Storm Lupit, the 21st storm named by the Japan Meteorological Agency of the 2003 Pacific typhoon season. Two days later, it strengthened into a typhoon and developed an eye. Lupit later began a prolonged movement to the northwest, during which it passed near several islands in Yap State. It later weakened due to increasing wind shear and drier air, and after recurving to the northeast, Lupit became extratropical south of Japan on December 2.

Typhoon Lupit first affected Pohnpei with tropical storm-force winds, and later it damaged or destroyed about 200 homes in Chuuk State. There, high waves flooded roads and homes, while high winds damaged crops. Damage was heaviest in Yap State, mostly in the small Ulithi atoll and Fais Island. On both islands, the typhoon contaminated the water supply and wrecked crops. Rainfall reached  on Ulithi, and gusts reached . Throughout the FSM, damage totaled about $1.7 million, although there were no deaths. The damage prompted the FSM government to declare two states as disaster areas, as well as a disaster declaration from the United States federal government. While Lupit was becoming extratropical, it became the first typhoon in December to threaten Japan in 13 years. There, the storm dropped rainfall that resulted in mudslides and flight cancellations.

Meteorological history

The origins of Typhoon Lupit were from a tropical disturbance that persisted in the monsoon trough on November 14 to the northeast of Kwajalein Atoll. There was a weak circulation with pulsating convection (thunderstorms) and weak outflow. The system drifted to the southwest without much organization. On November 17, the circulation intensified, although convection was initially unable to persist. The next day, outflow increased to the northeast, and the thunderstorms developed over the center. At around 1200 UTC on November 18, the Japan Meteorological Agency (JMA) classified the system as a tropical depression to the west of the Marshall Islands. Due to low wind shear, the Joint Typhoon Warning Center (JTWC) issued a tropical cyclone formation alert, indicating that tropical cyclogenesis was likely.

With a ridge located to the north, the depression tracked to the west-southwest upon forming. Late on November 20, the JTWC upgraded the depression to a tropical storm following an increase in deep convection, although the thunderstorms were located south of the center. After it turned more to the west, the JMA upgraded the depression to Tropical Storm Lupit to the northwest of Pohnpei on November 21. Outflow gradually increased, and an eye feature was evident by November 22. Based on the development of a  eye, the JTWC upgraded Lupit to a typhoon that day, and the JMA followed suit on November 23 when the storm was near the Caroline Islands. While the typhoon was intensifying, it briefly turned to the west-southwest on November 23, before a strengthening ridge to the southeast turned Lupit to the northwest. The eye gradually became better-defined as the typhoon strengthened, and it passed well to the south of Guam. On November 27, the Philippine Atmospheric, Geophysical and Astronomical Services Administration classified the system as Super Typhoon "Yoyoy" after the storm entered the agency's area of warning responsibility.

While around peak intensity, Typhoon Lupit had good outflow channels to the north and south. After peaking in intensity, Lupit underwent an eyewall replacement cycle, which caused the outflow to decrease and convection around the eye to diminish. Steady weakening began on November 28, accelerated by increasing wind shear, and late that day it weakened below super typhoon status. Lupit entered a weakness in the subtropical ridge, resulting in a turn to the north and later northeast into an area of cooler waters and drier air. The typhoon accelerated into the westerlies, and dry air entered the circulation while the convection rapidly diminished. While moving northeast off the southeast coast of Japan, Lupit weakened into a tropical storm on December 1. That day, the JTWC issued its last advisory on the storm, and the JMA declared Lupit as an extratropical cyclone on December 2. The next day, Lupit dissipated off the east coast of Japan.

Impact

Later, the storm affected Chuuk Atoll in the FSM on November 23. The Chuuk state government helped people in low-lying areas to evacuate. High waves flooded homes, and damaged roads and seawalls. About 200 houses were damaged or destroyed, and many homes affected by the typhoon had unsanitary conditions, a contaminated water supply, or lack of food. High winds downed banana and palm trees, and salt water damaged or wrecked all of the food crops in Chuuk.

Most of Yap State was affected by the typhoon, and the eye of Typhoon Lupit passed near the small atoll of Ulithi. In Fais, there was little flooding because it is an elevated island, although several buildings were damaged, mostly to roofs. Crops were wrecked on both islands, and on Ulithi, it was estimated that the soil would be unfit for growing for at least a year. Several islands' water supply were contaminated. On Woleai, the storm downed trees and power lines, and the runway was closed for a week after being covered with water. There, Lupit downed trees and damaged crops, while high seas flooded areas. There was moderate beach erosion, and some seawalls and coastal roads were damaged.

Throughout the FSM, Typhoon Lupit caused about $1.7 million in damage, although there were no deaths or serious injuries. After the storm, the governor of the FSM declared Chuuk and Yap states as disaster areas. The government sent water to affected areas via a private airline, although damaged runways prevented 60% of flights from being delivered. A government boat was also used to deliver supplies, but its motor was damaged. After it was repaired, the boat delivered 25,312 litres of water and 730 bags of rice. On December 19, United States President George W. Bush declared Yap State as a federal disaster area, which allocated funds for repairing damaged public buildings and debris removal. FEMA also provided emergency food assistance to nine islands in Yap, including Ulithi and Fais. The United Nations Office for the Coordination of Humanitarian Affairs provided $10,000 for purchasing supplies to the most affected areas. As part of Operation Christmas Drop, Japanese and American Air Force units sent four planes to various islands with various supplies and gifts, including to areas affected by the typhoon.

In the Izu Islands, the high rains caused mudslides and flooding that affected eight buildings. Winds reached  in Miyake-jima. In Yakushima, five flights were canceled due to the typhoon. Lupit was the first typhoon in 13 years to threaten Japan in the month of December.

See also

Typhoon Sudal – powerful typhoon in 2004 that caused heavy damage in the FSM

Notes

References

External links

JMA General Information of Typhoon Lupit (0321) from Digital Typhoon
JMA Best Track Data of Typhoon Lupit (0321) 
JMA Best Track Data (Graphics) of Typhoon Lupit (0321)
JMA Best Track Data (Text)
JTWC Best Track Data of Super Typhoon 26W (Lupit)
26W.LUPIT from the U.S. Naval Research Laboratory

2003 Pacific typhoon season
Typhoons in the Federated States of Micronesia
Typhoons
Lupit